The Netherlands Antilles Davis Cup team represented the Netherlands Antilles in Davis Cup tennis competition and were governed by the Netherlands Antilles Tennis Association until one year after their dissolution.

History
The Netherlands Antilles competed in its first Davis Cup in 1998.

The Netherlands Antilles qualified to compete in the Americas Zone of Group III in 2012, after being beaten by El Salvador in the Play-offs of Group II 2011, but did not enroll this year. They reached the semifinals of Group II on three occasions.

Players

Recent performances
(i) = Played on an indoor court

1990s

2000s

2010s

References

External links

δ Netherlands Antilles
Davis Cup
Davis Cup